Grassy Hill Natural Area Preserve is a  Natural Area Preserve located in Franklin County, Virginia, just to the west of the town of Rocky Mount.  The site is composed of rocky slopes with various hardwood species and patches of Virginia pine. Shallow basic soils, typified by heavy clay, are found among bedrock outcrops rich in magnesium. Rare woodland communities live upon these substrates, and numerous rare plants may be found within grassy forest clearings near the summit. Evidence at the preserve suggests that the majority of the site was once more open, and may have historically been maintained through a natural fire regime that has been suppressed during modern times.

The preserve is owned and maintained by the Virginia Department of Conservation and Recreation, and is open to the public. Public facilities at the preserve include  of hiking trails, educational signs, parking, and a kiosk.

See also
 List of Virginia Natural Area Preserves

References

External links
Virginia Department of Conservation and Recreation: Grassy Hill Natural Area Preserve

Virginia Natural Area Preserves
Protected areas of Franklin County, Virginia
Rocky Mount, Virginia